Ericsson Nikola Tesla d.d. is the Croatian affiliate of the Swedish telecommunications equipment manufacturer Ericsson. The company is named after the inventor Nikola Tesla and is the largest specialized provider of modern telecommunications products, solutions and services in central and eastern Europe.

The company is quoted on the Zagreb Stock Exchange, independently of Ericsson.

History
Ericsson Nikola Tesla traces its roots back to the state-owned Nikola Tesla Corporation founded in 1949 in Zagreb, then SFR Yugoslavia. It was very successful in the local telecommunications market, and the regional markets, especially of Europe, for over forty years. It became a licence partner of Ericsson of Sweden in 1953, selling large volumes of Ericsson systems into the USSR and other markets from 1958.

In 1977, the company began making Ericsson AXE switches under licence.

With the collapse of Yugoslavia and the independence of Croatia, the state began looking to privatize the corporation in the year 1992. By 1994, Ericsson emerged as the highest bidder and took a share of the corporation just short of majority ownership, integrating operations to a significant extent by 1995.

In 2011, the company was Croatia's eighth largest exporter.

Operations
The company is based in Zagreb, with some R&D activities in Split.  Staff number in excess of 1450.  Gordana Kovačević serves as president of Ericsson Nikola Tesla and head of its Management Board, while its Supervisory Board is normally headed by the head of the Ericsson Market Unit which includes Croatia.

Significant customers exist in Croatia and Bosnia and Herzegovina, as well as Russia, other states of the former USSR and SFR Yugoslavia, and parts of Africa and the Middle East, and the company markets to Croatia, foreign markets and the Ericsson Group.  Sixty percent of sales are exports.

Finances
Sales for 2007 totalled 1.78 billion US$, having risen year-on-year for many years.  Steadily rising costs of sales have eroded profit, with net income being just under 200 million US$ for 2007.

Market capitalization exceeds US$300 million.

References

External links 
Ericsson Nikola Tesla - Official site

Telecommunications companies of Croatia
Companies listed on the Zagreb Stock Exchange
Telecommunications companies established in 1949
1949 establishments in Yugoslavia
Companies based in Zagreb